Martin Florian van Amerongen (8 October 1941 – 11 May 2002) was a Dutch journalist, publisher, columnist and author. From 1985 to his death, except for a hiatus in 1997–1999, he served as editor-in-chief of the news weekly De Groene Amsterdammer.

References

1941 births
2002 deaths
Deaths from cancer in the Netherlands
Deaths from esophageal cancer
Dutch publishers (people)
Dutch newspaper editors
Dutch columnists
Dutch political writers
Dutch biographers
Male biographers
Dutch literary critics
Dutch male short story writers
Dutch historical novelists
Jewish Dutch writers
Journalists from Amsterdam
20th-century Dutch novelists
20th-century biographers
Dutch male novelists
20th-century Dutch short story writers
20th-century Dutch male writers
20th-century Dutch journalists